The Appel au peuple (Plebiscite) was a Bonapartist parliamentary group during the early years of the French Third Republic. They advocated a plebiscite by which the people would choose the form of government, which they assumed would be a revival of the Second French Empire. They were a significant force in the 1870s and 1880s They were associated with Boulangism and the right-wing Ligue des Patriotes. There was a brief revival of the Appel au peuple in the 1900s. Although the members supported universal suffrage, believed in advancement based on merit rather than birth, and had diverse views on other subjects, they were generally conservative. Many of them believed in the virtues of family, religion, free trade and private property.

Foundation

"Appel au Peuple" was the slogan of the Bonapartist party.
The Nantes shipowner Alphonse-Alfred Haentjens founded the Appel au Peuple parliamentary group late in 1871 to restore the Second Empire's ideals of democratic imperialism and free trade.
He looked for support among the rich winemakers of the southwest of France.
Until this time the Bonapartists had concealed their views, but now they openly challenged both the Left and the Right.
They claimed that they were more democratic than the Republicans, they mocked the Monarchists and they opposed Adolphe Thiers in his wish to tear up the low-tariff treaties of the empire.

The Bonapartists did not have consistent views on democracy.
Their program was deliberately vague, leaving it to the people to choose the form of the regime. 
The leaders assumed that a plebiscite, as in 1852, would produce a landslide in favour of return to an imperial system, but promised to respect the results of the plebiscite whatever they might be.
Eugène Rouher, the emperor's former chief minister, joined the group in February 1872.

First phase: 1872–1889

The Bonapartists claimed to be a democratic party but failed to effectively win over voters.
Between January 1872 and January 1874 they won only five seats in the Assembly: one in Charente-inférieure, two in Pas-de-Calais and two in Corsica.
On 16 March 1874 Napoléon, Prince Imperial, son of Napoleon III, spoke at his 18th birthday celebration in favour of an appel au peuple, or plebiscite.
He said, "if the name of Napoleon emerges an eighth time from the popular vote, I am prepared to accept the responsibility imposed on me by the national will."
Bonapartist candidates now won a series of by-elections starting with that of Philippe La Beaume de Bourgoing in Nièvre on 24 May 1874.
Running openly as a member of the Appel au People, Bourgoing won an absolute majority over the combined votes for the Republican and Legitimist candidates.
As soon as the results were announced he went to Chislehurst to pay his respects to Eugénie de Montijo.

After Bourgoing's victory a splinter group of Appel au Peuple deputies plotted with retired Bonapartist officers to overthrow the republic.
On 9 June 1874 a republican deputy read a circular from the Appel du Peuple central committee to the Chamber.
The circular promised to treat retired officers in the territorial army generously, in order to ensure their support.
The revelation caused an uproar that was only subdued when the Minister of War, Ernest Courtot de Cissey, said that no serving officers had been involved in the alleged plot.

Between 1881 and 1889 the group participated in the Union des Droites (Union of the Right).
In May 1882 Jean-Edmond Laroche-Joubert of the Appel du Peuple proposed voluntary voter registration, with a fixed fine for failure to register of 10% of the tax on liquid assets paid the previous year, or a minimum of 2 francs. The proposal was rejected by the Gauche Republicaine Cirier commission.
When the right-wing Ligue des Patriotes was created, members of the Appel au Peuple committee were present at the constitutive general assembly, as were Blanquists, revisionists, members of the Jeunesse Antisémite and members of Jules Guérin's Antisemitic League of France.
Louis Le Provost de Launay and Jules de Cuverville, both prominent Bonapartists, were members of the steering committee.

There was some common ground between Bonapartism and radical Boulangism, and Bonapartist leaders such as Prince Jérôme, Prince Victor Napoléon, and Paul Cassagnac thought they could profit from Boulangism.
Cassagnac encouraged General Boulanger to launch a coup in July 1887, and was disappointed when he failed to act..
In 1888 many Bonapartists joined Paul Déroulède's Ligue des patriotes.
The Bonapartists and Déroulède were the most extreme Boulangists.
However, Cassagnac did not trust Boulanger.
Early in 1889 he welcomed Boulanger's victory in Paris as a defeat of parliamentary democracy, but at other times he stated in his Gers newspaper Appel au peuple that with Boulanger there was a danger of a catastrophic war.

Later history: 1889–1910
After the 1889 French legislative election, the Appel au peuple parliamentary group was merged into the Réunion Générale des Députés de la Droite (General Meeting of the Deputies of the Right).
The Bonapartists adopted a "plebiscitary" stance in 1891 in an attempt to reaffirm the party's basis in revolutionary principles.
However, in the 1893 French legislative election, the party was reduced to only 13 seats in the chamber.
Many of the provincial newspapers closed, and the Appel au Peuple was suspended.

The Bonapartists reorganized in 1903 and formed an Appel au Peuple central committee headed by the Marquis  Jules-Albert de Dion.
Other leaders of the revived movement were Paul Cassagnac the younger, Le Provost de Launay and Pierre Taittinger, who would later become the leader of the Jeunesses Patriotes and then of the Juenesses plébiscitaires.
The new Appel au Peuple continued to support the Bonapartist pretender, but combined Bonapartist concepts with authoritarianism and plebiscitism.
After 1903 the revived Appel au Peuple opposed the pro-dynastic L'Autorité and the Comité politique plebiscitaire.
The Appel au Peuple was less hostile to elections than the Action Française, with whom its members often brawled, but cooperated with the Ligue des patriotes, which was becoming increasingly moderate.

Eventually the Groupe des Droites, combining Bonapartists and monarchists, was formed from 1910 to 1919.

Ideology

The Bonapartist appel au peuple concept in theory rooted power in the people, although in fact the leaders were more interested in manipulating public opinion than in following it.
However, the Bonapartist philosophy was more than simply using radical means to achieve conservative ends.
Some of the leaders were populists who mingled with the people and respected their right to social mobility based on talent or merit.
This contrasted with the monarchists, who expected the common people to defer to the upper classes and aristocracy.

The Bonapartists disagreed on tactics, policy and ideology.
They wanted an authoritarian democracy, but could not agree on whether it should be of the left or the right.
The divisions in the party were shown by the fact that Pierre Magne chose to join the cabinet of Albert de Broglie, whom most of the party despised, and that Prince Napoléon of the party's left wing did not attend the Chislehurst ceremony where the Prince Imperial was declared a full pretender.
Most Bonapartists were nevertheless conservative, emphasising that the foundation of society was the family, religion and property, and the people should respect the social authorities.

The effect was to cause some confusion between the Bonapartist and monarchist (legitimist or Orléanist) groups, who sometimes worked together to avoid splitting the vote in elections.
In other cases they were bitter enemies. 
In Gers the royalist newspaper Le Conservateur et le Gers réunis wrote in 1876 that the Bonapartist Cassagnac family preached "the people's rights to wealth, which is pure socialism ... these two men, father and son, who presume to subject the department of Gers to their doctrines, their complots, and their low intrigues."
The editor of the Bonapartist newspaper L'appel au peuple in Gers wrote, "With the [Bourbon] white flag you have the return of the old privileges; you have the suppression of universal suffrage; you will go back to the epoch when the very rich and noble alone had the right to participate in public affairs, in a word, had alone the right to vote."

Third Republic deputies
Deputies in the group during the Third Republic included:

Notes

Sources

1872 establishments in France
1889 disestablishments in France
Political parties established in 1872
Political parties disestablished in 1889